A by-election was held on 25 November 2021 for the North Yorkshire Police, Fire and Crime Commissioner post after the resignation of Philip Allott following his remarks on the murder of Sarah Everard. The election was won by the Conservative Party candidate Zoë Metcalfe.

Nominations opened on 21 October. The candidates contesting the election were Zoë Metcalfe (Conservative), Emma Scott-Spivey (Labour), James Barker (Liberal Democrats), Keith Tordoff (Independent) and Hannah Barham-Brown (Women's Equality Party).

Result

Previous result

References

2021 elections in the United Kingdom
Police and crime commissioner elections
Police, Fire and Crime Commissioner by-election, 2021
By-elections in England
November 2021 events in the United Kingdom